The Narcs are an award winning New Zealand band, that formed in 1980 in Christchurch, New Zealand, by bassist Tony Waine, drummer Bob Ogilvie and guitarist Garth Sinclair – departed/replaced by Australian guitarist/singer songwriter Andrew/Andy Dickson.

Christchurch remained the band's base with a series of resident club and pub gigs building their following. Touring had become a regular event for The Narcs by 1981, and the pressures of the road contributed to Bob Ogilvie leaving – being replaced by Steve Clarkson on drums in 1982. Keyboardist Liam Ryan became a full-time Narc in 1983.

The band pursued a management deal with Mike Chunn, and signed a record deal with CBS Records.

During a retreat at a commune the band wrote most of the songs for their debut album, Great Divide. The single, "Heart and Soul", peaked at No. 4 on the NZ charts. At the 1984 New Zealand Music Awards, the band won 3 awards and the album achieved gold disc status.

The band worked in both NZ and Australia, recording a total of four albums and playing alongside such acts as Midnight Oil, Split Enz, Elton John and Queen.

The band reformed in 2016 with ex-DD Smash drummer Peter Warren and Rikki Morris of The Crocodiles and have continued to play live and record music since then. In 2018, the band released new single 'Summerhill Stone'.

Discography

Albums

Extended Plays

Singles

Awards and nominations

Aotearoa Music Awards
The Aotearoa Music Awards (previously known as New Zealand Music Awards (NZMA)) are an annual awards night celebrating excellence in New Zealand music and have been presented annually since 1965.

! 
|-
| 1982|| The Narcs || Group of the Year||  || rowspan="7" | 
|-
| 1983 || The Narcs || Group of the Year||  
|-
| rowspan="4" | 1984 || "You Took Me Heart and Soul" || Most Popular Song || 
|-
| "You Took Me Heart and Soul" || Single of the Year || 
|-
| Dave McArtney for  "You Took Me Heart and Soul" by The Narcs || Producer of the Year || 
|-
| Andy Dickson (The Narcs) || Male artist of the Year || 
|-
| 1985 || Fane Flaws for "Diamonds On China" by The Narcs || Video the Year||  
|-

References 

Musical groups established in 1980
New Zealand musical groups